In the United Kingdom, the Investigatory Powers Tribunal (IPT) is a judicial body, independent of the British government, which hears complaints about surveillance by public bodies—in fact, "the only Tribunal to whom complaints about the Intelligence Services can be directed".

History 
It was established in 2000 by the Regulation of Investigatory Powers Act 2000 (RIPA) and replaced the Interception of Communications Tribunal, the Security Service Tribunal, and the Intelligence Services Tribunal.

The IPT does not disclose its address; it uses a PO box in Nine Elms, London, close to the Secret Intelligence Building. Its website was created in 2003 by Tricorn Media, which has worked extensively for the police and Home Office. The IPT and its shortcomings were discussed in a BBC Radio 4 File on 4 programme in September 2013.

Certain European Court of Human Rights judgments said the IPT offers no human rights remedy on surveillance questions, in particular Burden v United Kingdom (2008) 47 EHRR 38 and Malik v United Kingdom (Application no.32968/11) [2013] ECHR 794 (28 May 2013).

Jurisdiction
The tribunal has jurisdiction to consider complaints about the use of surveillance by any organisation with powers under the Regulation of Investigatory Powers Act. It is also the only judicial body with the power to investigate the conduct of the Security Service (MI5), the Secret Intelligence Service (MI6) and the Government Communications Headquarters (GCHQ).

Organisations under the IPT's jurisdiction must provide details to the IPT of any activity that is being complained about. The IPT will only decide whether any surveillance that is being carried out is lawful—i.e., that it has been appropriately authorised and is being conducted in accordance with the applicable rules. If it investigates a complaint and finds that surveillance is being carried out but is lawful, it will not confirm to the complainant that they are under surveillance, merely state that their complaint has not been upheld. The IPT is exempt from the Freedom of Information Act 2000 so information made available to it in the course of considering a complaint cannot be obtained under a freedom of information request.

Complaints may be dealt with on paper or by oral hearing, at the IPT's discretion.

A complaint about surveillance being conducted by a private person or a company cannot be heard by the IPT.

The legislation originally provided for no avenue to appeal, other than to take the case to the European Court of Human Rights. However, despite legislation in the Regulation of Investigatory Powers Act 2000 that sought to prevent any appeal or questioning of a judgement, the Supreme Court found in R (Privacy International) v Investigatory Powers Tribunal that errors in law made by the court may be subject to judicial review. Further legislation was subsequently introduced in the Investigatory Powers Act 2016 to codify in law the findings and allow for appeals on a point of law to the Court of Appeal in England and Wales or the Court of Session.

Members 
The IPT's ten members are appointed by the King for five-year terms, after which they may "stand down or declare themselves available for reappointment". The President and Vice President must both hold or have previously held senior judicial posts. The current President is Sir Rabinder Singh, a Lord Justice of Appeal who was appointed to the IPT in 2016 and became president on 27 September 2018. All the other members must be experienced barristers or solicitors.

As of November 2019, they are:

 President, Lord Justice Rabinder Singh
 Vice President, Lord Boyd of Duncansby
 Charles Flint QC
 Sir Richard McLaughlin
 Susan O'Brien QC
 Professor Graham Zellick CBE QC
 Mr Justice Edis
Mr Justice Sweeney
Christopher Symons QC
Desmond Browne CBE QC

Cases
Only select IPT rulings are published. Statistics concerning complaints dealt with by the IPT are published each year in the Annual Report of the Interception of Communications Commissioner. Those statistics shows that very few complaints about surveillance have been upheld; from 2000 to 2009, five out of at least 956 complaints have been upheld, as shown in the table below.

One of the IPT's few published rulings concerns the high-profile case of a family who were placed under surveillance by Poole Borough Council in order to investigate claims that the family were not living in the school catchment area which they claimed. The IPT ruled that the use of covert surveillance by the council was not appropriate.

In 2010, the IPT produced an annual report for the first time. The report provided statistics relating to the outcomes of complaints. It was stated that 210 complaints were considered in 2010 (including some carried over from the previous year) but 105 (50%) of these cases were inadmissible and were not investigated. This includes cases which were withdrawn, malformed, out of time, out of jurisdiction or, most commonly, "frivolous or vexatious". Sixty-five cases were considered by the IPT to be frivolous or vexatious—generally either obviously unsustainable or repeats of previous complaints.

In 2012, the IPT provided statistics relating to the number of new complaints received and those considered over the course of the year, but did not specify whether any had been upheld.

Following the global surveillance disclosures by Edward Snowden in 2013, the British government submitted documents to the tribunal which showed for the first time that its intelligence services could access raw material collected in bulk by the National Security Agency (NSA), and other foreign spy agencies, without a warrant. This appeared to contradict assurances given in July 2013 by the Parliamentary Intelligence and Security Committee which stated that in all cases in which GCHQ obtained intelligence from the US a warrant was signed by a minister.

On 6 November 2014, official documents disclosed to the IPT by the intelligence agencies revealed that their guidance policies allowed staff to access confidential communications between lawyers and their clients. This privileged relationship is usually strictly protected under British law, and leading campaigners said the disclosures had "troubling implications for the whole British justice system". The release of the documents resulted from a claim brought on behalf of two Libyan men who had sued the British government for alleged complicity in their detention and subsequent rendition to the Libyan authorities. The British government refused to make a full statement concerning the revelations contained in the documents, saying only that it did not comment on ongoing legal proceedings.

The IPT ruled in December 2014 that GCHQ did not breach the European Convention on Human Rights, and that its activities are compliant with Articles 8 (right to privacy) and 10 (freedom of expression) of the European Convention of Human Rights. However, in February 2015, the tribunal refined its earlier judgement and ruled that aspects of the data-sharing arrangement that allowed UK Intelligence services to request data from the US surveillance programmes Prism and Upstream did contravene said Articles and, as such, were illegal between – at least - 2007, when Prism was introduced, and 2014, when two paragraphs of additional information, providing details about the procedures and safeguards, were disclosed to the public in December 2014.

Furthermore, the IPT ruled that the legislative framework in the United Kingdom does not permit mass surveillance and that while GCHQ collects and analyses data in bulk, it does not practice mass surveillance. This complements independent reports by the Interception of Communications Commissioner, and a special report made by the Intelligence and Security Committee of Parliament.

In 2015, three parliamentarians took a case to the IPT that the Wilson Doctrine, that parliamentarians' communications should not be tapped, was being broken. The IPT panel, headed by two senior High Court judges, found the Wilson Doctrine is not enforceable in law and does not impose any legal restraints on the intelligence agencies. They said MPs have the same level of legal protection as the general public when it comes to interception of their communications, and that only lawyers and journalists have more protection due to human rights law. Subsequently, the Prime Minister and the Home Secretary said in Parliament that the protection of MPs communications from being intercepted still applies but does not extend to a blanket ban on surveillance. Section 26 of the Investigatory Powers Act 2016 placed the Wilson Doctrine on a statutory footing for the first time.

See also
Intelligence Services Commissioner
Investigatory Powers Act 2016
Mass surveillance in the United Kingdom
United States Foreign Intelligence Surveillance Court

References

United Kingdom administrative law
United Kingdom tribunals
Home Office (United Kingdom)
2000 establishments in the United Kingdom
United Kingdom intelligence community
Intelligence gathering law